George Brodie of Ailisk (died before 6 January 1716) was a Scottish politician.

In the Parliament of Scotland, he was a Shire Commissioner for Nairnshire from 1693 to 1702, then a Burgh Commissioner for Forres from 1703 to 1707.

He was the second son of Joseph Brodie of Ailisk, by his second wife. He married Emilia Brodie, the 5th daughter and co-heir of James Brodie of Brodie.

His children included:
 James Brodie (1695–1720), MP for Elginshire in 1720
 Alexander Brodie of that Ilk, Lord Lyon from 1727 to 1754.

References 
 

Year of birth missing
17th-century births
1710s deaths
Year of death uncertain
Shire Commissioners to the Parliament of Scotland
Members of the Parliament of Scotland 1689–1702
Burgh Commissioners to the Parliament of Scotland
Members of the Parliament of Scotland 1702–1707